James Bartholomew Radclyffe, 4th Earl of Newburgh and titular 6th Earl of Derwentwater (23 August 1725 – 2 January 1787) was a British nobleman, Earl of Newburgh in the Peerage of Scotland and titular Earl of Derwentwater in the Peerage of England.

He was born on 23 August 1725, the son of Charles Radclyffe, titular 5th Earl of Derwentwater (titular only, due to the attainder of Charles' older brother James Radclyffe, 3rd Earl of Derwentwater in 1716) and Charlotte Maria Livingston, 3rd Countess of Newburgh.

During the Jacobite rising of 1745, Radclyffe was captured with his father, but soon released. His father was beheaded on 8 December 1746.

On 11 November 1749, he married Barbara Kemp. They had two children:
Anthony James Radclyffe, 5th Earl of Newburgh (1757–1814)
Lady Anne Radclyffe (–1785)

He died on 2 January 1787.

References

1725 births
1787 deaths
Earls of Derwentwater
James 04
18th-century English nobility
English Jacobites
People from Slindon